Baldasaro is a surname. Notable people with the surname include:

Al Baldasaro (born 1956), American politician
Michael Baldasaro (1949–2016), Canadian politician and religious leader